Edo  (with diacritics), colloquially called Bini (Benin), is a language spoken in Edo State, Nigeria. It is the native language of the Edo people and was the primary language of the Benin Empire and its predecessor, Igodomigodo.

Distribution
Most of the Edo language-speakers live in Edo State, Nigeria. A smaller number of speakers are also found in Delta State and Ondo State and in other parts of Nigeria.

Edo is an Edoid language. This languages are also spoken in Rivers State and Bayelsa State, Nigeria.

Phonology

Vowels 
There are seven vowels, all of which may be long or nasal, and three tones.

Consonants 
Edo has a rather average consonant inventory for an Edoid language.

The three rhotics have been described as voiced and voiceless trills as well as a lax English-type approximant. However, Ladefoged found all three to be approximants, with the voiced–voiceless pair being raised (without being fricatives) and perhaps at a slightly different place of articulation compared to the third but not trills.

Phonotactics 
Syllable structure is simple, being maximally CVV, where VV is either a long vowel or  plus a different oral or nasal vowel.

Orthography 

Long vowels are written by doubling the letter. Nasal vowels may be written with a final -n or with an initial nasal consonant. Tone may be written with acute accent, grave accent, and unmarked, or with a final -h (-nh with a nasal vowel).

See also 
 Edo people
 Benin Empire

References 

 Emovon, Joshua A. (1979). A phonological study of Edo (Bini), with special reference to the verbal phrase.  University of London, School of Oriental and African Studies (United Kingdom)

External links 
 Edo Language Dictionary Online
 Hans Melzian's Edo-English Dictionary
 Rebecca Agheyisi's Edo-English Dictionary
 Centre for Edo Studies
 PanAfrican L10n page on Edo (Bini)
   Edo/Africa names dictionary{source Edoworld}
 Bini (Edo) wordlists and recordings at the UCLA Phonetics Archive
 Bini (Edo) Market Days  on Naija local

Edoid languages
 
Languages of Nigeria